Ali Khousrof (born 1992 in Sana'a) is a Yemeni judoka who competes in the men's 60 kg category. He competed in the 2008 Summer Olympics. In 2011, he was shot in the abdomen while participating in the 2011 Yemeni uprising. At the 2012 Summer Olympics, he was defeated in the second round by Yann Siccardi.

References

External links
 

Yemeni male judoka
1992 births
Living people
Olympic judoka of Yemen
Judoka at the 2008 Summer Olympics
Judoka at the 2012 Summer Olympics
People from Sanaa
Judoka at the 2006 Asian Games
Judoka at the 2010 Asian Games
Judoka at the 2014 Asian Games
Judoka at the 2018 Asian Games
Ju-jitsu practitioners at the 2018 Asian Games
Asian Games competitors for Yemen